Frederick Simpson may refer to:

 Frederick Simpson (boxer) (1916–1975), British boxer who competed in the 1936 Summer Olympics
 Frederick Simpson (athlete) (1878–1945), Mississauga Ojibway Canadian athlete
 Frederick Simpson (historian) (1884–1974), historian and fellow of Trinity College, Cambridge
 Fred Simpson (politician) (1886–1939), British Labour Party politician, MP for Ashton-under-Lyne 1935–1939
 Freddy Simpson (1883–?), English footballer for Lincoln City
 Fred Simpson (fl. 1999), coach for Rangers A.F.C. in Christchurch, New Zealand